Andrew Williams (born December 12, 1977) is an American musician and professional wrestler, well known as the former rhythm guitarist of Every Time I Die. As a professional wrestler, he is signed to All Elite Wrestling (AEW) under the ring name the Butcher, where he is known for his tag team with the Blade under the name the Butcher and the Blade.

Musical career
Williams had aspired to be a professional wrestler and trained at Renegade Wrestling Association in Ontario, Canada for six months, until he sustained a knee injury. During the layoff, he learned to play the guitar, and formed Every Time I Die alongside lead guitarist Jordan Buckley and drummer Michael Novak. He has appeared on every release that the band has done, and had not missed a live show, until January 2020, when he wrestled Diamond Dallas Page and Dustin Rhodes at Bash at the Beach. From January to March, Every Time I Die had written and recorded their ninth album, and had been expected to tour the album in June, supporting Parkway Drive and Hatebreed, but this would be delayed due to the COVID-19 pandemic. Since he could not tour with the band, he was able to continue working for All Elite Wrestling (AEW), as they are based in Jacksonville, and Florida has deemed wrestling as essential business critical to the state's economy. On January 17, 2022, Williams and Buckley announced on social media that Every Time I Die broke up. Williams had previously been with the other members of Every Time I Die (minus Keith Buckley) attempting to form a new band and expressed interest in collaborating with AEW music producer Mikey Rukus on Twitter. However, despite those events, Williams had previously hinted during AEW's talk show Hey! (EW) hosted by RJ City that he originally no longer had an interest in recording music saying "In the 25 years that I was a professional musician" when asked by City a question about his music career. On December 7, 2022; Williams had posted on Twitter jamming with founding Every Time I Die drummer Michael Novak hinting a return to music.

Professional wrestling career

In the mid-2010s, Williams resumed his training with Josh Barnett, initially as a workout session. He continued working with Barnett, but only sporadically, since he does not live in California. He began attending Grapplers Anonymous, based in Lackawanna, and received further training from long-time friend and professional wrestler Jesse Guilmette. During the summer of 2015, he started working on the independent circuit, and made run-ins at Smash Wrestling where he chokeslammed Tarik, and at Progress Wrestling, where he powerbombed Jimmy Havoc through a table. His first tag match was on a Interspecies Wrestling Halloween show, partnering Wes in a dark match, and defeating Los Dumbfucks. In February 2016, he returned to Smash Wrestling, and had another confrontation with Tarik, who laid him out in the ring. His first singles match was confirmed the following month after the show, but at Any Given Sunday 4, he was defeated by Tarik. During the match, he tore his meniscus, which he had surgery for, before going on tour with Every Time I Die ten days later.

In March 2017, Williams appeared at Joey Janela's Spring Break, successfully teaming with Penelope Ford in an intergender tag team match against Guilmette (under his Braxton Sutter ring name) and his wife Allie. Janela had suggested that Williams should wrestle either Nikolai Volkoff or Glacier at the event, but he declined, preferring the intergender matchup instead. September saw the beginning of Williams and Guilmette regularly teaming with each other, and in their first match at a Pro Wrestling Rampage event, they won the PWR Tag Team Championship, defeating the Upper Echelon (Colby Redd and P. B. Smooth). However, this reign was short-lived, lasting 63 days. In their first defence of the title, Williams was absent and was replaced by JJ Rumham (as he was playing in Newcastle during the Low Teens tour); the pairing of Guilmette and Rumham were defeated by the Homewreckers (Anthony Gaines and Jet Rebel). Known as the Butcher and the Blade, Williams and Guilmette predominately wrestled in promotions across the Northeast, as well as in Ottawa, where Capital City Championship Combat (C4) is based.

All Elite Wrestling (2019–present) 
On the November 27, 2019, episode of Dynamite, Williams (now known under the ring name the Butcher) made his debut for All Elite Wrestling (AEW) in a post-match attack on Cody, alongside the Blade and the Bunny, establishing themselves as heels. It was later revealed that the Butcher and the Blade had been hired by MJF, furthering his ongoing feud with Cody. On the December 11 episode of Dynamite, the Butcher won his first tag match in AEW when he and the Blade defeated Cody and Q. T. Marshall, who was handpicked by MJF. The following week on the December 18 episode of Dynamite, the Butcher and the Blade were defeated by Cody and his new partner, Darby Allin.

On January 15, 2020, Williams missed a live show in Paris for the first time in twenty-two years, to appear at Bash at the Beach. Teaming with MJF, the Butcher and the Blade defeated Marshall, Diamond Dallas Page and Dustin Rhodes in a six-man tag team match, where he took a Diamond Cutter from DDP. In March 2020, the Butcher and the Blade had a brief feud with the Jurassic Express (Jungle Boy, Luchasaurus and Marko Stunt), which would lead to the Butcher and the Blade ending their alliance with MJF. On the March 11 episode of Dynamite, the Butcher and the Blade teamed with MJF for the second and final time, in a defeat of the Jurassic Express. On the March 18 episode of Dynamite, they were defeated by Jungle Boy and Luchasaurus, following interference by MJF who called for the finisher, allowing Jungle Boy to send the Butcher to the outside and then he and Luchasaurus hit their finisher on the Blade.

During the summer, the Butcher and the Blade began working with Lucha Brothers (Rey Fenix and Penta El Zero Miedo) and later, formed a group, led by Eddie Kingston. However, the group disbanded on the November 18 episode of Dynamite, after the Butcher and the Blade sided with Kingston, while the Lucha Brothers reunited their Death Triangle group with Pac, who had returned the previous week. They feuded with Pac, Penta, and Fenix for the next couple of weeks.

Following AEW Revolution, the Butcher and the Blade ended their alliance with Kingston after he turned face and began teaming with Jon Moxley as they allied themselves with Matt Hardy who, along with Private Party, created a faction known as the Hardy Family Office.

Personal life
On Renee Paquette's podcast The Sessions Williams revealed he has Dyslexia.

Championships and accomplishments
Pro Wrestling Illustrated
Ranked number 315 of the top 500 singles wrestlers in the PWI 500 in 2020
Pro Wrestling Rampage
PWR Tag Team Championship (1 time) – with Braxton Sutter

References

External links

1977 births
Living people
20th-century American guitarists
21st-century American guitarists
All Elite Wrestling personnel
American heavy metal guitarists
American male guitarists
American male professional wrestlers
Musicians from Buffalo, New York
People from North Tonawanda, New York
Musicians with dyslexia
Professional wrestlers from New York (state)
Rhythm guitarists
Sportspeople from Buffalo, New York
20th-century American male musicians
21st-century American male musicians